Ban Rai is a subdistrict (tambon) in the Bang Krathum District of Phitsanulok Province, Thailand.

(Not to be confused with Ban Rai, Uthai Thani, which is a district (amphoe) in Uthai Thani Province, Thailand.)

Geography
Ban Rai borders Bang Rakam District and Wang Nam Khu of Mueang Phitsanulok District to the north, Bang Krathum to the east, Khok Salut to the south and Phichit Province to the west.
Most of Ban Rai lies in the Nan Basin, although a narrow strip of land on the west side of the subdistrict lies in the Yom Basin. Both basins are part of the Chao Phraya Watershed. The Nan River flows through Ban Rai at Ban Khok Salut, and the Yom River forms part of the subdistrict's border with Phichit.

Administration
The subdistrict is divided into 10 smaller divisions called (muban) (villages). There are seven villages, several of which occupy multiple mubans. Ban Rai is administered by a Tambon administrative organization (TAO). The mubans in Ban Rai are enumerated as follows:

Temples
Ban Rai is home to the following four temples:
Wat Sirisutthawas (วัดสิริสุทธาวาส in Ban Wat Kwang)
Wat Khok Salud (วัดโคกสลุด Ban Khok Salud Village Temple) in Ban Khok Salud
Wat Prai Soowan (Thai: :th:วัดไพรสุวรรณ, Golden Forest Temple) in Ban Yan Non Prai
Wat Mai Ratsongtham (วัดใหม่ราษฎร์ทรงธรรม in Ban Rai)

References

Tambon of Phitsanulok province
Populated places in Phitsanulok province